Laleu may refer to:

 Laleu, Orne, France
 Laleu, Somme, France